Eric Lukin (born 14 June 1979) is an American former soccer player who is last known to have played as a defender, midfielder, or forward for TuS Koblenz.

Career

Lukin is the all-time top scorer of the University of Illinois at Chicago.

In 2002, he signed for German third division side Sportfreunde Siegen from Pomorac in Croatia.

References

External links
 Eric Lukin at FuPa

American soccer players
Expatriate footballers in Croatia
Living people
American expatriate soccer players
American expatriate soccer players in Germany
Croatian Football League players
Regionalliga players
American people of Croatian descent
Sportfreunde Siegen players
TuS Koblenz players
Association football defenders
Association football midfielders
Association football forwards
NK Pomorac 1921 players
1979 births